Mimics Parade is a 1991 Indian Malayalam-language comedy film directed by Thulasidas and starring Siddique, Jagadish, Sunitha, Suchitra and Alummoodan in the lead roles. The film has two sequels, Kasargod Khader Bhai (1992) and Again Kasargod Khader Bhai (2010).

Plot
A group of Mimicry artists gets hold of a doll filled with diamonds from an accident site which leads to all sorts of trouble from a criminal named Kasargod Khader Bhai.

Cast
 Siddique as Sabu
 Jagadish as Unni
 Ashokan as Jimmy
 Zainuddin as Nissam
 Baiju as Manoj
 Ansar Kalabhavan as Anwar
 Innocent as Fr. Francis Tharakkandam
 Mala Aravindan as Mammootty
 Sunitha as Sandhya Cherian
 Suchitra as Latha
 Alummoodan as Kasargod Khader Bhai
 Philomina as Thandamma
 Shivaji as Frederick Cherian, Sandhya's elder brother
 Sadiq as Stephen Cherian, Sandhya's second elder brother
 Prathapachandran as Cherian, Sandhya's father
 Mohanraj as Khader Bhai's right hand
 Thesni Khan as Dance teacher

Soundtrack 
The film's soundtrack contains 2 songs, both composed by Johnson and lyrics by Bichu Thirumala.

External links
 
 Mimics Parade at the Malayalam Movie Database
 Mimics Parade at Cinemaofmalayalam.net

1990s Malayalam-language films
1991 comedy films
1991 films
FMimicKader1
Films directed by Thulasidas
Indian comedy films